Dzidra Ritenberga (29 August 1928 – 9 March 2003) was a Latvian actress and film director.
Ritenberga won the best actress award at the 1957 Venice International Film Festival for her performance as Malva in Malva.

From 1976 she directed a few films at Riga Film Studio.

Selected filmography

References

External links 

1928 births
2003 deaths
Latvian film actresses
Latvian women film directors
Soviet film actresses
Soviet women film directors

Volpi Cup for Best Actress winners
Latvian Academy of Music alumni
Burials at Forest Cemetery, Riga